Josef Velenovský (22 April 1858 – 7 May 1949) was a Czech botanist, mycologist, pteridologist, and bryologist. He also worked with fossils. He was a research investigator and professor in the Botanical Institute of the University of Prague, alternating with his colleague Ladislav Josef Čelakovský. He was also professor of botany at Charles University, where he concentrated in the study of mycology in final half of his life. Velenovský collected innumerable material, particularly in new central Bohemia, and described at least 2000 species of fungi. Many of his type specimens and other collections are located in the herbarium of the Národní Museum of Prague.

Eponymous taxa
Notocactus velenovsky 
Trifolium velenovskyi 
Tortula velenovskyi 
Centaurea velenovskyi 
Astragalus velenovskyi 
Russula velenovskyi 
Naucoria velenovskyi 
Galium velenovskyi 
Entoloma velenovskyi 
Daphne velenovskyi 
Hilpertia velenovskyi 
Cortinarius velenovskyanus 
Cyanus velenovskyi 
Mollisia velenovskyi

See also
 :Category:Taxa named by Josef Velenovský

References

External links
Botany.cz Biography (in Czech)

Czech botanists
Czech mycologists
1858 births
1949 deaths
Charles University alumni